Evelyn (minor planet designation: 503 Evelyn) is a main belt asteroid discovered by Raymond Smith Dugan on 19 January 1903. The asteroid was named after Evelyn Smith Dugan, mother of the discoverer.

References

External links
 
 

Background asteroids
Evelyn
Evelyn
XC-type asteroids (Tholen)
Ch-type asteroids (SMASS)
19030119